Sylvia Gabelmann (born 7 September 1958) is a German politician. Born in Bad Homburg vor der Höhe, Hesse, she represents The Left. Sylvia Gabelmann has served as a member of the Bundestag from the state of North Rhine-Westphalia since 2017.

Life 
Sylvia Gabelmann finished school in 1977 with the Abitur. She first trained as a pharmacy assistant and then studied pharmacy at the University of Frankfurt am Main, graduating in 1986. She worked in her profession until 2002. She became member of the bundestag after the 2017 German federal election. She is a member of the Health Committee. She is spokesperson for her group on pharmaceutical policy and patients' rights. In November 2020, Gabelmann announced, that she will not be reelect in 2021 German federal election.

References

External links 

  
 Bundestag biography 

1958 births
Living people
Members of the Bundestag for North Rhine-Westphalia
Female members of the Bundestag
21st-century German women politicians
Members of the Bundestag 2017–2021
Members of the Bundestag for The Left